Natarajan Chandrasekaran (born 2 June 1963) is an Indian businessman, and the chairman of Tata Sons. He was chief operating officer (COO) and executive director of Tata Consultancy Services (TCS), where in 2009, he became chief executive officer (CEO). He was also the chairman of Tata Motors and Tata Global Beverages (TGB). He became the first non-Parsi and professional executive to head the Tata Group. He has assumed the chair of B20 India and will lead the business agenda during India’s G20 presidency.

Education and career
Chandrasekaran studied in a Tamil Government school in Mohanur. He later received a bachelor's degree in applied sciences from the Coimbatore Institute of Technology in Tamil Nadu. He earned his Master of Computer Applications (MCA) from the Regional Engineering College, Tiruchirappalli (now National Institute of Technology, Tiruchirappalli), in Tamil Nadu, India, in 1986. Joining TCS in 1987, Chandrasekaran took over as CEO on 6 October 2009, prior to which he was COO and executive director of TCS. Chandrasekaran is a senior member of Institute of Electrical and Electronics Engineers (IEEE), and an active member of Computer Society of India and British Computer Society. He was nominated as the chairman of Indian IT industry body NASSCOM in April 2015.

Career 
Chandrasekaran has spent his career in TCS, joining the company in 1987 after completing a Masters in Computer Applications from Regional Engineering College, Trichy in Tamil Nadu.

Under his leadership TCS has generated consolidated revenues of US$16.5 billion in 2015-16. With over 556,000 consultants, TCS has become the largest private sector employer in India. TCS remains the most valuable company in India ended 2015–16 with a market capitalization of over US$70 billion. In 2015 TCS was rated as the world's most powerful brand in IT Services, and was recognized as a Global Top Employer by the Top Employers Institute across 24 countries.

On 25 October 2016, Chandrasekaran, then CEO and managing director of Tata Consultancy Services (TCS), was appointed an additional director on the Tata Sons board.

2018/2019 NCLAT verdicts 
The Tata Sons board voted to remove Cyrus Mistry from the Chairmanship of Tata Sons on 24 October 2016.

In July 2018, the National Company Law Tribunal (NCLAT), issued a verdict in favor of Tata Sons on charges of mismanagement leveled by Mistry in 2016, two months following his ousting as chairman through a vote of non-confidence. On 10 July 2018, Mistry stated that he would appeal the decision.

In December 2019, the Tribunal reinstated Mistry as the Chairperson of Tata Sons for his remaining term, and declared that the appointment of Chandrasekaran as executive chairman was illegal.

2020 Supreme Court  
In January 2020, Tata Sons appealed to the Supreme Court of India against NCLAT's decision. Mistry stated that he would not return to the Chairmanship of the conglomerate, but was interested in reserving his seat in the company's board. A three-judge bench comprising Chief Justice S. A. Bobde and Justices B. R. Gavai and Surya Kant stayed NCLAT's order while hearing Tata Sons' appeal on 10 January 2020.

The bench stated, "We find there are lacunae in the judicial orders passed by the NCLAT."

The Supreme Court also ordered that Tata Sons will not exercise power under Article 25 of the Company Law for pushing out shares of minority holders in the company.

Personal life
Chandrasekaran was born into a Tamil family in Mohanur near Namakkal in Tamil Nadu, India. He resides in Mumbai, with his wife Lalitha. Chandrasekaran is an avid photographer, music aficionado and a passionate long-distance runner who has completed marathons in Amsterdam, Boston, Chicago, Berlin, Mumbai, New York and Tokyo. He completed his fastest marathon or personal record (PR) at TCS New York City Marathon (2014) with a finishing time of 5 hr 00 min 52 sec.

Awards and recognition 
 Chandrasekaran has received several awards and recognition in the business community. India's central bank, the Reserve Bank of India appointed him as director on its board in 2016. 
 Mr. Chandrasekaran was also conferred with Honorary, Doctor of Science (D.Sc.) Honoris Causa Degree by Aligarh Muslim University at special annual convocation ceremony in 2021.
 In Mar. 2022, Chandrasekaran has been honoured with Padma Bhushan by Government of India under Prime Minister Narendra Modi for excellence in Trade and Industry
 He has served as the Chairperson of the IT Industry Governors’ at the WEF, Davos in 2015-16. Aside from being a member of Indo–US CEO Forum, he is also part of India's business taskforces for Australia, Brazil, Canada, China, Japan and Malaysia. 
 He served as the chairman of NASSCOM, the apex trade body for IT services firms in India in 2012-13 and continues to be a member of its governing Executive Council.
 He was voted as the ‘Best CEO’ for the fifth consecutive year by the Institutional Investor's 2015 Annual All-Asia Executive Team rankings. During 2014, he was voted as one of CNBC TV 18 - ‘Indian Business Icons'.
 
 He was also awarded CNN- IBN Indian of the Year 2014 in business category. 
 Chandrasekaran was presented with the "Best CEO for 2014" by Business Today for the second consecutive year. 
 He has also received the Medal of the City of Amsterdam Frans bannick Cocq in recognition of his endeavor to promote trade and economic relations between Amsterdam and India. 
 He was awarded Qimpro Platinum Standard Award 2015 (Business) and Business Today’s Best CEO 2015 (IT & ITEs).
 Chandrasekaran was conferred with the honorary doctorate by JNTU, Hyderabad, India (2014). 
 He has received Honorary Doctorate from Nyenrode Business Universiteit, Netherlands' top private business school (2013). 
 Chandrasekaran has also been conferred honorary degrees by many Indian universities such as the Gitam University (2013)  KIIT University (2012); and the SRM Institute of Science and Technology (2010).
 He was also awarded as the performer of the month in Feb. 1999 for his best administration.
 In April 2017, India Today magazine ranked him #10th in India's 50 Most powerful people of 2017 list.
 On 12 August 2017, Chandrasekaran  was conferred the degree of Doctor of Letters (Honoris Causa) by his alma mater National Institute of Technology, Tiruchirappalli.

See also
 Tata Sons
 Indian Institute of Management Lucknow
 Jamshed Jiji Irani

References

External links
  Tata.com
  World Economic Forum
 Viva la e-volution - A blog by N.Chandrasekaran
 Fortune India
 New York Times
 Knowledge at Wharton

Living people
1963 births
Tamil people 
Tata Consultancy Services people
National Institutes of Technology alumni
Indian chief executives
People from Namakkal district
People from Tamil Nadu 
National Institute of Technology, Tiruchirappalli alumni
Reserve Bank of India